The Uzgen Minaret also spelled as Özgön Minar or Uzgend Minaret is an 11th-century minaret tower located in Uzgen, Kyrgyzstan. It forms part of the ancient ruins in Uzgen along with three well preserved mausoleums located nearby.

Built with bricks, the Uzgen minaret's architecture consist of three distinctive parts. The upper part with arched windows and a cupola is a relatively recent addition, built in 1923 to 1924.

Gallery

See also
 Minaret
 List of oldest minarets
 List of tallest minarets

References

Towers completed in the 11th century
Islamic architecture
Minarets
Towers in Kyrgyzstan